John Belfield Bamber (8 June 1912 – 2000) was an English footballer who played in the Football League for Stoke City.

Career
Bamber was born in Preston and played for his local club, Preston North End. He failed to break into the team at Deepdale and left for non-league Fleetwood Town before signing for Stoke City in 1933. He made a perfect start to his Stoke career scoring on his debut against Leicester City in December. Despite this however, Bamber soon became used as a reserve player and he went on to spend six seasons at the Victoria Ground making just 24 appearances.

Career statistics

References

English footballers
Stoke City F.C. players
Preston North End F.C. players
Fleetwood Town F.C. players
English Football League players
1912 births
2000 deaths
Association football central defenders